Tadnoll and Winfrith Heath is a nature reserve of the Dorset Wildlife Trust, near the village of Winfrith Newburgh in Dorset, England. There is heathland and  wetland in the reserve.

Winfrith Heath is designated a Site of Special Scientific Interest. The wetland is designated a Ramsar site, and the reserve has been listed as a Special Area of Conservation.

Description
The chalk stream Tadnoll Brook, a tributary of the River Frome, runs through the site.

The heathland has common heather, bell heather and gorse. Species of birds include nightjar and Dartford warbler, and the silver-studded blue butterfly may be seen.

In the boggy areas of heathland there is sphagnum moss, bog asphodel and sundew. The wetland habitat supports important species of plant and insects including marsh clubmoss and the small red damselfly. In new ponds, colonies of pillwort, a rare aquatic fern, have formed in less than a decade.

See also
 Dorset Heaths

References

Dorset Wildlife Trust reserves
Heaths of the United Kingdom
Ramsar sites in England
Sites of Special Scientific Interest in Dorset
Special Areas of Conservation in England